Paterno is a 2018 American television drama film directed by Barry Levinson. It stars Al Pacino as former Penn State football coach Joe Paterno, and his career leading up to his dismissal following the university's child sex abuse scandal in 2011. Riley Keough, Kathy Baker, Greg Grunberg and Annie Parisse also star. The film premiered on HBO on April 7, 2018.

Plot
As Joe Paterno enters an MRI machine in November 2011 he recalls events in his life.

On October 29, 2011 Paterno wins his 409th game as head coach of the Penn State Nittany Lions football team. During 61 years at Penn State University, he helped the former "cow college" quintuple its financial endowment and build Paterno Library. At the age of 84, Paterno is so beloved as "a coach, an educator, and a humanitarian" that a statue is outside Beaver Stadium, and so powerful that when university president Graham Spanier and athletic director Tim Curley asked Paterno to retire in 2005, he refused. Inside the stadium, Spanier, Curley, and vice president Gary Schultz worry about a grand jury investigating accusations of child sexual abuse against Jerry Sandusky, a retired assistant coach.

Six days after Penn State defeats Illinois, The Patriot-News reporter Sara Ganim learns that the grand jury's presentment also indicts Curley and Schultz. Although he is so traumatized by the abuse he suffered that he does not want his mother to read the presentment, high school student Aaron Fisher, known in Ganim's articles as "Victim 1", was the first to publicly testify against Sandusky. Rumors spread about "Victim 1"'s identity, and Fisher is attacked at school by other students, but his psychologist tells Ganim that Fisher and his mother repeated his story to many skeptical people to protect other children. Ganim and her editor discuss other allegations against Sandusky from 1998 and later, such as the rape of a young boy at the 1999 Alamo Bowl. They realize that the university has protected him for years.

Paterno's wife Sue and their adult children, including assistant coach Jay and lawyer Scott, are horrified by the accusations against Sandusky. They want to help the elderly Paterno, but do not understand why he continues to prepare for the upcoming game against Nebraska instead of reading the presentment. As reporters besiege Paterno's home, the coach tells his family that when a distraught Mike McQueary told him in 2001 about seeing Sandusky sexually assaulting a young boy in the men's shower room on campus, he did his legal duty by telling Curley and Schultz. Paterno says that Sandusky's The Second Mile charity helped many children. Mary Kay Paterno asks her father why he waited two days to report McQueary's account — "You hear about someone diddling my kids? Don’t wait the weekend!" — and whether he followed up on his report.

Penn State students gather at Paterno's home to support the coach, who announces that he will resign as head coach after the football season. John Surma and others on the university board of trustees, however, force Spanier to resign and fire Paterno during a phone call. Ganim reports on a riot by students who denounce the media and cheer for Paterno. Sue and Joe Paterno discuss a Sugar Bowl during the 1970s, at which Sandusky played with their young children at a hotel pool while Paterno was preparing for the game. She presumes that her husband would not have let Sandusky do so had he known that he was a pedophile; he tells her "I was working. I wasn't focused on the goddamn pool". That night, however, he has a nightmare about the memory. Not on the sidelines for the first time since 1965, Paterno watches on television as Nebraska defeats Penn State.

Paterno is diagnosed with fatal lung cancer. Driving by the stadium after the MRI, he sees people next to the statue argue about Paterno's legacy. Another alleged victim tells Ganim that he told Paterno that Sandusky abused him in 1976.

Cast

Production
On September 8, 2012, it was reported that ICM Partners would take a package for a film about Joe Paterno starring Al Pacino as Paterno. On January 16, 2013, it was reported that Brian De Palma would direct the film. HBO subsequently picked up the film, but on September 19, 2014, it was reported that the network had suspended pre-production on the project due to budget issues. On June 5, 2017, it was reported that the film was once again moving forward with Pacino starring and Barry Levinson directing. In June 2017, Riley Keough, Kathy Baker, and Greg Grunberg joined the cast. On July 10, 2017, Annie Parisse joined the cast. On July 16, 2017, it was reported that the film had begun production.

Music
The music is composed by Evgueni Galperine and Sacha Galperine who recently worked with Barry Levinson in The Wizard of Lies. The score has been released at Lakeshore Records.

Reception

Paterno was met with a generally positive response from critics. The website's critical consensus reads, "Paterno, elevated by deft direction from Barry Levinson and a strong Al Pacino performance, presents a hard-hitting dramatization of a gut-wrenching real-life story." Metacritic, which uses a weighted average, assigned the film a score of 69 out of 100, based on 19 critics, indicating "generally favorable reviews".

Ben Travers of IndieWire gave the film a grade of "A−" and praised Pacino's performance, saying, "Pacino's Paterno is at once wracked with guilt and oblivious to any misdeeds. He's a figure of sympathy and disgust. Pacino constructs the man along with the movie, both timing his subtle tips to critical scenes... and adeptly downshifting as his stature dips from a myth to a man."

IGN gave the film a 6.7, or, "Okay" rating, saying that the film "doesn't answer the lingering questions about the once beloved college football coach, provide any insight into the scandal, or offer a means of evoking empathy for those affected."

The film drew criticism from 300 of Paterno's former players, who signed a letter in protest to the film's portrayal of the former Penn State coach. However, around the film's release, The Patriot-News, in its online edition at PennLive, evaluated the film's accuracy and found it accurate, though noted it used artistic license in its presentation of the known facts ("...the deep dive into the conscience of Joe Paterno is something that appears to have been pure dramatic license"). This was also backed up by David Newhouse, who reviewed the film's script during production and had no changes to suggest though he added it utilized "Hollywood storytelling".

The British newspaper The Guardian described the film's retelling of the Sandusky scandal as "messy".

Accolades

References

External links
 

HBO Films films
Films directed by Barry Levinson
Films about pedophilia
Films about child sexual abuse
American football films
Films set in 2011
Penn State Nittany Lions football
2018 films
2010s American films